Daniel Bautista Rocha (born August 4, 1952) is a Mexican former track and field athlete and Olympic champion. He was born in El Salado, San Luis Potosí.

In his relatively short career, Bautista dominated the walk, on the track as well as in road events.  He won international attention in 1975 when he won the 20 km walk at the Pan-American Games in his native Mexico City, which made him among the favorites for the Olympic games the following year.

At the 1976 Summer Olympic games in Montreal he won the gold ahead of two East German athletes, Hans-Georg Reimann who won silver, and defending Olympic champion Peter Frenkel who took bronze. Bautista was so dehydrated after the event that he had to drink ten cans of soft drink before he could produce enough urine for the drug test that he had to take.

In the following years, Bautista set two new world record in the 20 km, as well as having the years best times at other distances.  In 1977 and 1979 he won the IAAF World Race Walking Cup in the 20 km walk.

At the 1980 Summer Olympic games in Moscow he was disqualified 1800 meters from the finish.  He also started the 50 km, but was forced to quit after 30 km.  After that he ended his career.

References

Sources
This article is based on a translation of an article from the German Wikipedia.

External links 
 

1952 births
Living people
Mexican male racewalkers
Olympic athletes of Mexico
Sportspeople from San Luis Potosí
Athletes (track and field) at the 1975 Pan American Games
Athletes (track and field) at the 1976 Summer Olympics
Athletes (track and field) at the 1980 Summer Olympics
Athletes (track and field) at the 1979 Pan American Games
Olympic gold medalists for Mexico
World record setters in athletics (track and field)
Medalists at the 1976 Summer Olympics
Pan American Games gold medalists for Mexico
Olympic gold medalists in athletics (track and field)
Pan American Games medalists in athletics (track and field)
Central American and Caribbean Games gold medalists for Mexico
Competitors at the 1978 Central American and Caribbean Games
World Athletics Race Walking Team Championships winners
Central American and Caribbean Games medalists in athletics
Medalists at the 1975 Pan American Games
Medalists at the 1979 Pan American Games
20th-century Mexican people